Downsizing refers to process of moving to a property of smaller size or lesser value.

Reasons to downsize

There are multiple reasons why a choice may be made to downsize.

Difficulties with downsizing

Many people downsizing from a larger property to a smaller one will find their current possessions, appliances and furnishings will be unable to fit in the new smaller home.  Some people will find it especially difficult to accept the need to dispose of possessions, and this will cause some considerable anxiety.  Following a disposal methodology can be a useful approach if the task seems impossible: One approach is to determine what furniture, displayed items and commonly used items are suitable for and will fit in the new home: remaining belongings will need to be sorted into what is to be kept and what is to be disposed of.

Disposal strategies

After the basic fundamental items that will move to the new home have been determined there will remain a set whose fate will need to be decided.

See also
 Home equity loan
 Property ladder
 Move-up home

References

Footnotes

Sources
 
 
 
 

Real estate
Real estate terminology
Personal finance